Higbee High School is a public high school located in Higbee, Missouri, United States. The high school and junior high school have 107 students in grades seven through twelve. Jennifer Juergensmeyer is the principal. The school mascot is the tiger, with black and gold being the school colors. The small high school size prevents it from fielding a football team.  The school offers boys baseball and girls softball in both fall and spring. Basketball is offered in the winter months. Boys and girls track and field are offered in the spring.

References

External links

School profile

Public high schools in Missouri
Schools in Randolph County, Missouri